Libertatia (also known as Libertalia) was a purported pirate colony founded in the late 17th century in Madagascar under the leadership of Captain James Misson (last name occasionally spelled "Mission", first name occasionally "Olivier").  The main source for Libertatia is Volume 2 of A General History of the Pyrates, a 1724 book which describes Captain Misson and Libertatia.  Little to no corroborating evidence for Libertatia beyond this account has been found, however.  Whether Libertatia was real but somehow "lost" to history, a pirate legend that the author recorded based on interviews with sailors, or a concocted work of utopian fiction by the author from the start is contested.

Background

Libertalia was a legendary free colony founded by pirates led by Captain Misson, although most historians have expressed doubts over its existence outside of literature. Libertalia got its name from the Latin word liberi which means "free". Misson's idea was to have his society be one in which people of all colours, creeds, and beliefs were to be free of any scrutiny. He wanted to give the people of Libertalia their own demonym, not one of a past country of origin. Historian and activist Marcus Rediker describes the pirates as follows:

The pirates were against the authoritarian institutions of their day, including monarchies, slavery, institutional religion, and the abuses associated with wealth. Like some historically documented pirates, they practiced direct democracy, where the people as a whole held the authority to make laws and rules, and also used systems of councils composed of delegates who were supposed to think of themselves as "comrades" of the general population, not rulers. They created a new language for their colony and operated a socialist economy.

The pirate utopia's motto was "for God and liberty," and its flag was white, in contrast to a Jolly Roger.

Captain James Misson 
According to the account in A General History of the Pyrates, Misson was French, born in Provence, and it was while he was in Rome on leave from the French warship Victoire that he lost his faith, disgusted by the decadence of the Papal Court. In Rome he ran into Caraccioli – a "lewd Priest" who over the course of long voyages with little to do but talk, gradually converted Misson and a sizeable portion of the rest of the crew to his way of thinking:

Embarking on a career of piracy, the 200 strong crew of the Victoire called upon Misson to be their captain. They shared the wealth of the ship, deciding "all should be in common."

Location 
The consensus of modern scholarship is that Libertalia (or Libertatia) was not a real place, but a work of fiction. Journalist Kevin Rushby toured the area seeking descendants of pirate inhabitants without success, noting “others have tried and failed many times”. There were pirate settlements on and around Madagascar, on which Libertalia may have been based: Abraham Samuel at Port Dauphin, Adam Baldridge at Ile Ste.-Marie, and James Plaintain at Ranter Bay were all ex-pirates who founded trading posts and towns. These locations appear frequently in official accounts and letters from the period, while Libertalia appears only in Johnson's General History, Volume 2. Johnson writes about the overall set up of Libertalia. The settlement was purported to have an elevated fort on each side of the harbor with 40 guns in each fort, from the Portuguese. Below the fort, under the protection of the forts, was where the living quarters along with the rest of the town was located. Libertalia was located roughly 13 miles east-south-east of the nearest town.

Criticism 
Johnson's "Libertalia" has been treated as completely fictional, as apocryphal, or as a utopian commentary. The inclusion of fictional accounts such as Misson's in A General History has caused some modern scholars to discount the entire work as a reliable source, though other portions of it have been at least partially corroborated by various sources.

Libertalia in popular culture

Literature
William S. Burroughs 
Cities of the Red Night, 1981
Ghost of Chance, 1991
Daniel Vaxelaire. Les mutins de la liberté, 1986
Johnson, Charles. A General History of the Pyrates, 1724 (in Volume 2)
 Libertalia, une utopie pirate (French extract of "Histoire générale des plus fameux pirates"), L'Esprit Frappeur
Marcus Rediker. "Libertalia: The Pirate's Utopia," in Pirates: Terror on the High Seas from the Caribbean to the South China Sea.
Peter Lamborn Wilson. Pirate Utopias: Moorish Corsairs & European Renegadoes, 1995Pirates of the Caribbean: Legends of the Brethren Court: Wild Waters, 2009
Rushby, Kevin. Hunting Pirate Heaven, 2001
W. E. Johns. Biggles and the Pirate Treasure, 1954
Langrehr, Rick. Libertalia: Stealing Equality, 2022

 Museum 
Pirates Museum in Antananarivo, since 2008

 Film Against All Flags (1952)The King's Pirate (1967)The Grand Tour (2020)

Video gamesAssassin's Creed IV: Black Flag (2013) (mentioned only)Europa Universalis IV (2013)Fallout 4 (2015) (has a floating settlement of bandits named "Libertalia")Uncharted 4: A Thief's End (2016) (altered interpretation in which the colony is referred to as "Libertalia," and was founded by Henry Avery and Thomas Tew among other famous pirates.)

MusicYe Banished Privateers: The Legend of Libertalia (album, 2014)Jake and the Infernal Machine: Libertalia (album, 2014)Ja, Panik: Libertatia'' (album, 2014)
FreibeuterAG Libertalia (song)

See also
Republic of Pirates

References

External links
 Of Captain Thomas Tew
 Paul Orton's Thomas Tew page
 Return to Pirate Island, JSTOR Daily
 A General History of the Pyrates Vol. II, Project Gutenberg version

History of Madagascar
Piracy in the Indian Ocean
Pirate dens and locations
Utopian fiction
Fictional African countries
Maritime folklore
Nautical fiction